La Roche-Maurice is a commune in the Finistère department of Brittany in northwestern France.

Population
Inhabitants of La Roche-Maurice are called in French Rochois.

International relations
La Roche Maurice's twin town is Bishopsteignton, a village between Newton Abbot and Teignmouth in Devon, England.

See also
Communes of the Finistère department
La Roche-Maurice Parish close
List of the works of the Maître de Thégonnec

References

External links

Official website

Mayors of Finistère Association 

Communes of Finistère